The 2010–11 Women's EHF Cup was the 30th edition of the competition, taking place from 4 September 2010 to 8 May 2011. Denmark's FC Midtjylland defeated compatriot Team Tvis Holstebro to win its second EHF Cup. It was the second time the final was played by two clubs from the same country.

Qualifying rounds

Round 1

Round 2

Round 3

Last 16

Quarter-finals

Semifinals

Final

References

Women's EHF Cup
EHF Cup women
EHF Cup women